The Division of Australian Capital Territory was an Australian electoral division in the Territory of the same name. The division was created in 1949 and included the whole of the city of Canberra and surrounding rural areas.

Prior to 1949, the Australian Capital Territory (ACT) had no representation in the Australian Parliament.  The ACT's first member was elected at the 1949 federal election.  However, until 1966 he could only vote on matters relating to the ACT and did not count for the purposes of forming government. In 1966, full voting rights were granted. For most of its history it was a fairly safe seat for the Australian Labor Party.

In 1974, the division was divided into two new divisions, Canberra and Fraser.  The last member for the united division, Kep Enderby, transferred to Canberra.

Members

Election results

References

Australian Capital Territory